Bon Secours Maryview Medical Center is a historic, general medical and surgical hospital in Portsmouth, Virginia and affiliated with Bon Secours Health System (USA).

Adjoining the hospital campus is Bon Secours Maryview Behavioral Medicine Center.

Upon the closing of Portsmouth General Hospital, its former hospital services were gradually transferred to Maryview and Bon Secours Health Center at Harbour View in Suffolk between 1996 and 1999.

See also

Bon Secours DePaul Medical Center, also in Hampton Roads, Virginia

References

External links
 Bon Secours Maryview Medical Center official site
 Bon Secours Maryview Behavioral Medicine Center official site

Bon Secours Sisters
Hospitals in Virginia
Portsmouth, Virginia